Mimomusonius viettei is a species of beetle in the family Cerambycidae, and the only species in the genus Mimomusonius. It was described by Breuning in 1980.

References

Crossotini
Beetles described in 1980
Monotypic beetle genera